Molla Yusef (also Romanized as Mollā Yūsef) is a village in Balghelu Rural District, in the Central District of Ardabil County, Ardabil Province, Iran. At the 2006 census, its population was 4,752, in 1,150 families.

References 

Towns and villages in Ardabil County